Farefare or Frafra, also known by the regional name of Gurenne (Gurene), is the language of the Frafra people of northern Ghana, particularly the Upper East Region, and southern Burkina Faso. It is a national language of Ghana, and is closely related to Dagbani and other languages of Northern Ghana, and also related to Mossi, also known as Mooré, the national language of Burkina Faso.

Frafra consists of three principal dialects, Gurenɛ (also written Gurunɛ, Gudenne, Gurenne, Gudeni, Zuadeni), Nankani (Naane, Nankanse, Ninkare), and Boone. Nabit and Talni have been mistakenly reported to be Frafra dialects.

Names 
The general and accepted name for the language is Farefare or Frafra. The varieties in Ghana are usually called "Gurene", and those in Burkina-Faso are called "Ninkare".

Orthography 
The Frafra language uses the letters of the Latin alphabet except for c, j, q, x, and with the addition of ɛ, ɩ, ŋ, ɔ, and ʋ. The tilde is used for showing nasalization in Burkina Faso, but in Ghana it is shown using the letter n. The two nasal vowels /ɛ̃/ and /ɔ̃/ are spelt with ẽ and õ respectively. All long nasal vowels only get their tilde written on the first letter.

Acute, grave, circumflex, caron, and macron are sometimes used in grammar books to indicate tone, but not in general-purpose texts. The apostrophe is used to indicate the glottal stop.

Phonology

Consonants 
Frafra has a system of 17 phonemes (or 19, counting /ɣ/, an allophone of /g/, and /ɾ/, an allophone of /d/):

The sound /ŋ/ appears in front of some words starting with /w/, leading them to change into the /j/ sound. /h/ only appears in loanwords, exclamations, and as an allophone of /f/. An example of both of these sound changes are weefo and yeho (both meaning "horse"). The only consonants Frafra words may end in are the two nasals /m/ and /n/.

Glottal stop 
Glottal stops appear at the initial vowel of a word, but are not transcribed. Word-medially, vowel nasalization continues over the glottal stop. In rapid speech, the glottal stop is usually dropped, similar to how vowel hiatus gets dropped in Spanish.

Word medial glottal stops must be marked in writing.

Allophones

Allophones of /r/ 
[d] and [ɾ] are two phonetic realizations of the same phoneme. [d] occurs at the beginning of words, and [ɾ] is its counterpart everywhere else.

Allophones of /g/ 
[ɣ] is an allophone of /g/ that occurs after certain vowels. It is mostly written "g." Usage of the letter "ɣ" is quite rare.

Allophones of /j/ 
[ɲ] is an allophone of /j/ that occurs before a nasal vowel. It is always written as "y."

Sandhi 
This section will describe all the morpho-phonological sandhi processes that affect Frafra.

Nasals 
Nasal consonants undergo assimilation, coalescence, and elision.

Assimilation at  Point of Articulation 
Nasals assimilate to the point of articulation of the occlusive the proceed.

 /m/ goes before /p/ and /b/
 /n/ goes before /t/ and /d/
 /ŋ/ goes before /k/

Coalescence 
When a nasal is followed by /g/, the two consonants amalgamate.

 /n/ + /g/ = /ŋ/

This rule does not apply to compound words (e.g. tẽŋgãnnɛ "sacred land") or loanwards (e.g. maŋgo "mango")

Elision 
Nasals disappear when they go before /f/

 /m/ + /f/ = /f/
 /n/ + /f/ = /f/

Stops 
Two voiced stops become their unvoiced foNorthernrm. Remember that [ɾ] is the word-medial allophone of /d/

 /g/ + /g/ = /k/
 /r/ + /r/ = /t/

Sonorants

Vibrant assimilation 
Vibrant consonants, also called taps, assimilate to a preceding lateral or nasal.

 /l/ + /r/ = /ll/
 /n/ + /r/ = /nn/
 /m/ + /r/ = either /nn/ or /mn/

Lateral assimilation 

 /n/ + /l/ = /nn/
 /m/ + /l/ = /nn/

Combination of these processes 
C designates any consonant, and N designates any nasal.

 Cm + r = Cn
 Cl + r = Cl

Vowels 
Frafra has 9 oral vowels and 5 nasal vowels.

All Frafra vowels have a long form.

Vowel harmony 
Like many Mande languages, Frafra features vowel harmony. When suffixes are added to word roots, the vowel in the root selects whether the suffix will use the tense or lax form. The exception is suffixes ending in "-a" because /a/ is neutral in Frafra, meaning that it is only one form. Prefixes do not exist in Frafra.

Where all vowels must be in harmony 
In disyllabic words, both vowels are always in harmony. The same applies in vowel sequences.

Mid vowels 
The lax vowel -a in noun and verb endings will change the tense vowels /e/ and /o/ to lax vowels /ɛ/ and /ɔ/.

Close vowels 
When a suffix's vowel is close, and stem's vowel is close and tense, it causes the suffix's vowel to become tense.

For example, the locative postposition "-ʋm" becomes "-um" after the vowels /i/, /ĩ/, /u/, and /ũ/.

 pʋʋrɛ ("belly") > pʋʋrʋm ("inside the belly")
 nifo ("eye") > nifum ("inside the eye")

However, tense vowels that are not close do not affect "ʋm". Therefore poore ("back") becomes poorʋm ("behind").

The particle "nɩ," which goes after a verbs to mark the incomplete aspect, becomes "ni" after /i/, /ĩ/, /u/, and /ũ/.

Grammar

Tone
Guren​ɛ marks a high and a low tone. Changes in tone have an impact on either the lexical or grammatical function of a particular word.

Lexical Function
With low tones the word becomes a verb, whereas with high tones it is a noun.

Grammatical Function
The low tone on the preverbal tense marker wà indicates future, while the high tone on the same element indicates aspect.

Noun Classes
Nouns in Gurunɛ have different "classes" with regard to plurals:

Pronouns

Personal Pronouns

Emphatic Pronouns
Only emphatic pronouns can appear in focus positions, whereas all other pronouns cannot appear in those positions. Emphatic pronouns are used in exclusive contexts, in which the speaker indicates that only one thing is true and not the other.

Reciprocal Pronoun
The reciprocal pronoun is taaba and occurs postverbally.

Reflexive Pronouns
To form a reflexive pronoun in Gurenɛ the morphem -miŋa for singular or -misi for plural is attached to a particular personal pronoun. While in other Gur languages, the reflexive morphem is not sensitive to number, in Gurenɛ there exist two forms, one for each number.

Relative Pronouns
There are two relative pronouns, ti and n. The former relativizes subjects, while the latter is used to relativize objects. Both pronouns are not sensitive to number or animacy, while this is the case in other Gur languages such as Dagbani for instance.

Interrogative Pronouns
Interrogative pronouns can either occur sentence-initially or sentence-finally.

Demonstrative Pronouns
Each demonstrative pronoun refers to a single noun class.

Syntax

Word Order
The word order in Gurenɛ is strictly SVO.

Verb Phrase
The verb phrase (VP) consists of pre- and postverbal particles surrounding the verb. Preverbal particles encode aspect, tense, negation, and mood, such as imperative and conditional. Postverbal particles also encode aspect and tense, but in addition to that they can also encode focus. The order of particles within the VP is strictly organized as shown below. Moreover, the maximal amount of pre- and postverbal particles is also strictly defined. There can be at maximum five preverbal and two postverbal particles within one clause in Gurenɛ. 

Time > Tense > Conditional > Aspectual > Future > Negation > Emphatic > Epistemic > Purpose > Verb > Tense > Focus/Affirmative/Completive/Directional

Particles
There are a lot of particles in Gurenɛ, such that the total number is not fully clear. The following table provides an overview of the most common particles.

Verb
The verb in Gurenɛ consists of an obligatory stem or root, that can take one or more morphems. Verbs appear either in the perfective or imperfective form, depending on its aspect. The perfective expresses actions in the present, whereas the imperfective denotes actions in the past or progressive.

Question Formation
There are several ways of forming a question in Gurenɛ, but importantly the strict word order SVO is always to obey.

Ex situ
In subject questions the question word occurs as the first element of the clause and can either function as the subject or as the agent of the clause.

In situ
In general, questions are formed by raising intonation of the final tone. Questions without an explicit question word have a clause-final question marker -ì.

Embedded
Questions can be embedded and are then preceded by the complementizer tí.

Multiple Questions
Question can also be formed by more than one question word. In these cases one question word occurs ex situ and the other(s) in situ. Again, a question word can only appear ex situ, if it replaces the subject or agent of the clause.

Long distance extraction
Question words in Gurenɛ can also cross clause boundaries, such that they originated in the embedded clause and have been fronted to the clause-initial position.

Greetings

Geography 

Solemitẽŋa means "land of the white man" and is used to refer to all non-African countries.

Soleminɛ is theoretically referring to all non-African languages, however it is only used to refer to English.

Notes

References

Bibliography
Atintono, Samuel (2011). Verb Morphology: Phrase structure in a Gur Language (Gurenɛ). Saarbrücken: Lambert Academic Publishing. 
Bodomo, Adams, Hasiyatu Abubakari & Samuel Alhassan Issah (2020). Handbook of the Mabia Languages of West Africa. Glienicke: Galda Verlag
Kropp-Dakubu,M.E., S. Awinkene Antintono, and E. Avea Nsoh, A Gurenɛ–English Dictionary and accompanying English–Gurenɛ Glossary
Kropp-Dakubu, M.E. (2009). Parlons farefari (gurenè): langue et culture de Bolgatanga (Ghana) et ses environs. Paris: L`Harmattan 
 
Ninkare Frafra Dictionary

External links 

 
The VP-periphery in Mabia languages

Languages of Ghana
Oti–Volta languages
Articles citing ISO change requests